The King Is Fat'n'Old is the second studio album by the  Italian progressive metalcore band Destrage, released on October 4, 2010, by Coroner Records worldwide and by Howling Bull in Japan.

Track listing

Personnel
Destrage
Paolo Colavolpe – vocals
Matteo Di Gioia – guitar
Ralph Salati – guitar
Gabriel Pignata – bass
Federico Paulovich – drums
Additional performer
Mattias Eklundh – guitar (track 3)

References

Destrage albums
2010 albums